The New Calabar River is a river in Rivers State, Nigeria, in the Niger River Delta. The Kalabari Kingdom was based on this river.

References

Rivers of Rivers State